Zsolt Németh (born 1 February 1991) is a Slovak football defender  of Hungarian ethnicity who plays for Gyirmót SE.

External links
 
 Futbalnet profile 
 FC DAC 1904 Dunajská Streda official club profile

References

1991 births
Living people
Association football defenders
Slovak footballers
FC DAC 1904 Dunajská Streda players
KFC Komárno players
MŠK - Thermál Veľký Meder players
Slovak Super Liga players
Hungarians in Slovakia